Patrick Juola is an internationally noted expert in text analysis, security, forensics, and stylometry. He is a professor of computer science at Duquesne University.  As a faculty member at Duquesne University, he has authored two books and more than 100 scientific publications as well as generated more than two million dollars in Federal research grant funding.  He works in the field of computer linguistics and computer security currently serving as Director of Research at Juola & Associates and Principal of the Evaluating Variations in Language Laboratory. He is credited with co-creating the original biometric word list. Juola has also created a Java-based open source authorship attribution suite JGAAP, Java Graphical Authorship Attribution Program, with several students at Duquesne University including David Berdik, Sean Vinsick, Amanda Kroft, and Michael Ryan.

Patrick Juola is the author of Principles of Computer Organization and Assembly Language, a textbook on computer organization and assembly language, published through Prentice-Hall.  He also wrote Authorship Attribution, a survey and technical monograph on authorship attribution, the process of inferring the author or author's characteristics from the text of a document, published through NOW Publishers.

Patrick Juola was instrumental in identifying J.K. Rowling as the author of The Cuckoo's Calling.

He was born in 1966 in Renton, Washington.  Juola attended the Johns Hopkins University, and received his Ph.D. from the University of Colorado at Boulder under Lise Menn.  He is married and currently has no children.

References

External links
Juola & Associates
Evaluating Variations in Language Lab

American computer scientists
1966 births
Living people
Duquesne University faculty
Johns Hopkins University alumni
University of Colorado alumni
Computer security academics